Deborah Ruth "Deb" Whitten (born December 5, 1966 in Victoria, British Columbia) is a former field hockey goalkeeper from Canada who represented her native country at the 1992 Summer Olympics in Barcelona, Spain. There she ended up in seventh place with the Canadian National Women's Team.

References

External links
 
 
 

1966 births
Living people
Canadian female field hockey players
Female field hockey goalkeepers
Olympic field hockey players of Canada
Field hockey players at the 1992 Summer Olympics
Pan American Games silver medalists for Canada
Pan American Games bronze medalists for Canada
Pan American Games medalists in field hockey
Field hockey players at the 1991 Pan American Games
Field hockey players at the 1995 Pan American Games
Field hockey players from Victoria, British Columbia
Medalists at the 1995 Pan American Games
Medalists at the 1991 Pan American Games